Marchfield may refer to:

Marchfield (assembly), early medieval institution among the Franks and Lombards
Marchfield, Barbados, a village in Saint Philip Parish
Marchfield (horse), winner of the Breeders' Stakes (2007)